In the Beginning (also released as Cassandranite) is an album featuring the demo tapes recorded in 1965 by trumpeter Woody Shaw in his original quest for a recording contract of Blue Note Records which was eventually released on the Muse label in 1983.
Cassandranite was released as part of Woody Shaw: The Complete Muse Sessions by Mosaic Records in 2013.

Reception

Ron Wynn of Allmusic stated, "Some interesting, uneven, but worthwhile '65 material from trumpeter Woody Shaw... His potential certainly emerges, as does the fact he was a tentative, unsure soloist at this juncture".

Track listing 
All compositions by Woody Shaw except as indicated
 "Cassandranite" - 7:00 
 "Obsequious" (Larry Young) - 8:00 
 "Baloo Baloo" (Hank Johnson) - 6:00 
 "Three Muses"- 6:22 
 "Tetragon" (Joe Henderson) 6:35

Personnel 
Woody Shaw - trumpet 
Joe Henderson - tenor saxophone
Herbie Hancock (tracks 3-5), Larry Young (tracks 1 & 2) - piano
Paul Chambers (tracks 3-5), Ron Carter (tracks 1 & 2) - bass
Joe Chambers - drums

References 

Woody Shaw albums
1983 albums
Muse Records albums